"Nobody Else" is a 1998 song by American singer and songwriter CeCe Peniston. The composition was to be the lead single of the singer's originally scheduled album release on the Silk Entertainment label, as well as reportedly released on Steve Hurley's compilation The Voices of Life, Vol 1. The production of her album was cancelled eventually, and releasing of the compilation wouldn't happen either. However, the singer released another two singles on the label, "He Loves Me 2" the following year and "My Boo" in 2000.

The "Silk's House Revival" remix of the song granted Hurley, along with another five mixes made in favor of other artists, a Grammy Award-nomination  for the Best Non-Classical Remixed Recording in 1999; lost to David Morales.

The song was also released on the various artist's compilation Hit Mania Dance Estate 1998, Vol. 2, which charted at number two on the Italian Albums Chart, and was listed as number forty-one in the year-end chart in Italy.

Critical reception
Larry Flick from Billboard wrote, "The belter who made multi-format noise a few years ago with hits like "Finally" and "We've Got A Love Thang" returns with a jam that revisits those tracks' house-inflected sound while also exploring raw gospel and old-school soul avenues. Peniston tears through this song with ferocious energy, while producer Steve "Silk" Hurley keeps the groove slick and accessible to both clubs and crossover radio formats. This single is sure to thrill die-hards who have been missing the singer's distinctive voice. It should also jump-start her career again quite nicely. Look for this single on Peniston's forthcoming album of the same name, as well as on Hurley's own imminent multi-artist album, Voices Of Life."

Credits and personnel
 CeCe Peniston – lead vocal, writer
 Steve Hurley – writer, remix, arranger, producer, executive producer
 James Pullin – writer
 Maurice Joshua – remix
 Eric Miller  – remix
 Gary Booker  – remix
 Steve Johnson – assistant engineer
 Steve Weeder – mix engineer
 Hinge, Chicago – mix
 Microfoam S.L. – design
 Silktone Songs Inc. (ASCAP) – publisher

Track listings and formats

 12", ES, Promo, #NM7086MX
 "Nobody Else" (Silk's Filter Dub) - 5:06
 "Nobody Else" (Silk's Spiritual Reprise) - 5:18
 "Nobody Else" (Silk's Radio Edit) - 4:29
 "Nobody Else" (Silk's House Revival Mix) - 13:35

 12", FR, #FTR 4019-6
 12", IT, #UMD 368
 12", US, #SENT 9802-1
 "Nobody Else" (Silk's House Revival Mix) - 13:35
 "Nobody Else" (Silk's Filter Dub) - 5:06
 "Nobody Else" (Silk's Spiritual Reprise) - 5:18
 "Nobody Else" (Silk's Radio Edit) - 4:29

 12", US, #SENT 9804 1
 "Nobody Else" (Maurice's Funk-A-Mix) - 6:59
 "Nobody Else" (Booker T's Dub) - 6:23
 "Nobody Else" (E-Smoove's 12" Mix) - 7:39
 "Nobody Else" (Booker T.´s 12" Mix)  6:09

 MCD, ES, Promo, #NM7086CDMX
 MCD, FR, #FTR 4019-2
 MCD, US, #SENT 9802-2
 MCD, US, Promo, #SENT 9802 2
 "Nobody Else" (Silk's Radio Edit) - 4:29
 "Nobody Else" (Silk's House Revival Mix) - 13:35
 "Nobody Else" (Silk's Filter Dub) - 5:06
 "Nobody Else" (Silk's Spiritual Reprise) - 5:18

Music awards and nominations
Grammy Awards

References

General

 Specific

External links 
 

1998 singles
CeCe Peniston songs
Songs written by CeCe Peniston
Songs written by Steve "Silk" Hurley